Ypresiglaux (meaning "Ypresian owl") is an extinct genus of strigiform bird from the Early Eocene London Clay Formation of Essex, United Kingdom and Nanjemoy Formation of Virginia, United States. The genus contains two species: Y. michaeldanielsi, known from a partial skeleton, and Y. gulottai, known from a distal tarsometatarsus.

Discovery and naming 

Ypresiglaux was described in 2022 by German paleontologist Gerald Mayr and British zoologist Andrew C. Kitchener. The generic name, "Ypresiglaux", combines a reference to the Ypresian-dated type locality with the Greek word "glaux," meaning "owl". The type species, Y. michaeldanielsi, was described on the basis of a partial skeleton collected in 1992. This specimen, NMS.Z.2021.40.26, which includes the mandible, vertebrae, pectoral girdle, wing bones, and a partial right leg, was designated as the holotype. NMS.Z.2021.40.27, an additional specimen collected in 1982, consists of the distal portion of the right femur, distal half of the right tarsometatarsus, and pedal phalanges. It was also referred to Y. michaeldanielsi. These fossils were discovered by Michael Daniels in layers of the London Clay Formation (Walton Member), dated to the early Ypresian, which is located near Walton-on-the-Naze in Essex, England. The specific name, "michaeldanielsi", honors Michael Daniels. Y. michaeldanielsi represents one of the most completely-known Palaeogene owls.

Additional fossil material, consisting of a partial right femur, partial right tarsometatarsus, and pedal phalanges (specimen NMS.Z.2021.40.27) was also collected from the Walton Member
of the London Clay Formation. Since the fossil material is slightly larger than overlapping bones of Y. michaeldanielsi, it is possible that it represents a female specimen of the latter, since sexual dimorphism has been consistently observed in owls. Some important differences between the bones suggest that they may represent a distinct species. However, due to the lack of morphological differences, the specimen could not be confidently placed beyond "Ypresiglaux sp."

In 2016, Gerald Mayr described a distal right tarsometatarsus as belonging to a new species of the extinct owl genus Eostrix, E. gulottai. The holotype specimen, SMF Av 627, was discovered in layers of the Eocene (Ypresian)-dated Nanjemoy Formation (Potapaco Member) of Stafford County, Virginia, USA. In 2022, Mayr and Kitchener moved  'Eostrix' gulottai to the new genus Ypresiglaux as the new combination, Y. gulottai. The specific name honors Marco Gulotta, the discoverer of the specimen.

Description 
Ypresiglaux was a very small owl. Y. michaeldanielsi was comparable in size to the Eurasian Pygmy Owl, which has a body mass of 50–77 grams. Y. gulottai was even smaller, and represents the smallest known owl (extinct or extant). It is suggested that it likely had a diet comparable to the similarly-sized extant long-whiskered owlet and elf owl, which primarily eat arthropods.

It is likely that Ypresiglaux did not have the same degree of head rotational mobility as extant owls because of differences in the atlas and axis. Mayr and Kitchener (2022) further suggest that Ypresiglaux occupied a diurnal niche, contrary to extant owls, which are often nocturnal. Preserved fossilized toe pad integument was observed on a piece of matrix collected with a pedal phalanx. A similar instance was seen in the holotype of the contemporary Lutavis.

Classification 
In their phylogenetic analyses, Mayr & Kitchener (2022) recovered Ypresiglaux in various positions within the Strigiformes. They stated that the discovery of additional fossil material could provide more insight into the exact phylogenetic relationships of Ypresiglaux. The cladogram below displays the results of two different phylogenetic analyses.

 Topology 1: Strict consensus tree

Topology 2: 50% majority-rule consensus tree

See also 
 Paleobiota of the London Clay

References 

Owls
Eocene birds of North America
Extinct birds of North America
Eocene birds of Europe
Extinct birds of Europe
Prehistoric bird genera
Birds described in 2022
Fossil taxa described in 2022